The 1891 Cork Senior Football Championship was the fifth staging of the Cork Senior Football Championship since its establishment by the Cork County Board in 1887.

Clondrohid won the championship following a 3-05 to 0-02 defeat of Nils in the final. This was their first ever championship title.

Results

Final

Statistics

Miscellaneous
 Clondrohid win the championship for the first time.
 Nils qualify for the final for the first time.

References

Cork Senior Football Championship